Acrolophus pyramellus is a moth of the family Acrolophidae. It was described by William Barnes and James Halliday McDunnough in 1913. It is found in North America, including Arizona, California and Nevada.

References

Moths described in 1913
Taxa named by Edward Meyrick
pyramellus